Pubitelphusa trigonalis is a moth of the family Gelechiidae. It is found in Korea.

The wingspan is 14-14.5 mm. The forewings have a dark grey basal fascia within one-fourth of the length and a creamy white antemedian band on the anterior half, with two brownish scale-tufts on the posterior half. The median fascia is dark fuscous, with several small scale-tufts on its surface. The costa has a small ochreous spot at the middle and a large, triangular ochreous patch at three-fourths. The area beyond the medial fascia is densely speckled with dark fuscous scales centrally and there are ochreous scales scattered along the inner margin beyond the tornus. The hindwings are grey.

Etymology
The species name refers to the shape of the fusion of the vinculum and the sacculus and is derived from the Greek trigono.

References

Moths described in 2007
Litini